David Gordon Strickland, Jr. (October 14, 1969 – March 22, 1999) was an American actor. He was best known for his role as the boyish rock music reporter Todd Stites in the NBC sitcom Suddenly Susan.

Life
David Gordon Strickland, Jr., was born on October 14, 1969, in Glen Cove, Long Island, New York. His parents, David Gordon Sr. and Karen, both worked as executives. Strickland moved with his family to Princeton, New Jersey, and later to Los Angeles, where he became an actor. Strickland guest starred in the television series Dave's World, Roseanne, Mad About You, and Sister, Sister, until he landed his role on Suddenly Susan in 1996. 

In his personal life, Strickland suffered from bipolar disorder and had a long and troubled history of drug and alcohol abuse. Five months before his death, Strickland was arrested for cocaine possession, pleaded no contest, and was sentenced to three years' probation and ordered into drug rehabilitation. He was due in court for a progress report on the day of his death. News reports of events leading up to Strickland's death suggest that he had chosen to stop taking the lithium he was prescribed to control his bipolar disorder.

Death
On March 20, 1999, Strickland and comedian Andy Dick flew from Los Angeles to Las Vegas and spent three days partying in strip clubs. After checking into a motel, Strickland spent time with a sex worker, consumed six bottles of beer, and then hanged himself with a bed sheet over the ceiling beam. He died during the morning hours of March 22, 1999, at the age of 29. His body was discovered by a private investigator hired by his friend and co-star Brooke Shields when Strickland missed his appearance in Los Angeles Municipal Court for cocaine possession. Evidence of drug use was found in his room. The Clark County Coroner concluded that Strickland's body bore the marks of a previous suicide attempt.

After much discussion, the writers of Suddenly Susan decided to deal with Strickland's death directly by killing off his character, Todd Stites. In the show's third season finale, Todd fails to appear at work one day. When Susan calls Todd regarding tickets to a show, his pager vibrates on his desk. After learning for the first time about a number of good deeds he had done throughout his life, Susan spends the day searching for Todd. The episode ends when the police call Jack's phone, and Susan and her coworkers are gathered in a prayer circle, and the details of Todd's death are left ambiguous. The episode is interspersed with out-of-character interviews with Shields and the show's supporting cast.

Filmography

References

External links

 

1969 births
1999 suicides
Male actors from New Jersey
Male actors from New York (state)
American male film actors
American male television actors
People from Glen Cove, New York
People with bipolar disorder
Suicides by hanging in Nevada
20th-century American male actors
People from Princeton, New Jersey
1999 deaths